Abu Alimeh (also Romanized as Abū ‘Alīmeh and Abū ‘Aleymeh) is a village in Gazin Rural District, Raghiveh District, Haftgel County, Khuzestan Province, Iran. At the 2006 census, its population was 207, in 41 families.

References 

Populated places in Haftkel County